19th Brigade may refer to:

Australia
 19th Brigade (Australia)

Belarus 
 19th Guards Mechanized Brigade (Belarus)

Hungary
19th Infantry Brigade (Hungary)

United Kingdom
 19th Light Brigade (United Kingdom), an infantry brigade
 19th Mounted Brigade (United Kingdom)
 Artillery Brigades
 19th Brigade Royal Field Artillery
 XIX Brigade, Royal Horse Artillery (T.F.)

United States
19th Infantry Brigade (United States)

See also
 19th Army
 19th Division
 19th Regiment
 19th Battalion
 19th Group
 19 Squadron